Poecilomorpha is a genus of beetles in the family Megalopodidae, containing the following species:

 Poecilomorpha abyssiniea Pic, 1951
 Poecilomorpha apicalis Pic, 1951
 Poecilomorpha assamensis (Jacoby, 1908)
 Poecilomorpha atricolor Pic, 1951
 Poecilomorpha atricornis Pic, 1951
 Poecilomorpha atripes Lacordaire, 1845
 Poecilomorpha aureovillosa Jacoby, 1894
 Poecilomorpha bicoloripes Pic, 1951
 Poecilomorpha binotata Peringuey, 1892
 Poecilomorpha bipartita Lacordaire, 1845
 Poecilomorpha calabarica Westwood, 1864
 Poecilomorpha chariensis Pic, 1912
 Poecilomorpha curta Pic, 1951
 Poecilomorpha cyanipennis (Kraatz, 1879)
 Poecilomorpha delagoensis Pic, 1913
 Poecilomorpha discolineata (Pic, 1938)
 Poecilomorpha diversipes Pic, 1951
 Poecilomorpha divisa Jacoby, 1895
 Poecilomorpha dollmani Bryant, 1931
 Poecilomorpha downesii (Baly, 1859)
 Poecilomorpha fasciaticeps Pic, 1951
 Poecilomorpha freyi Pic, 1951
 Poecilomorpha gerstaeckeri Westwood, 1864
 Poecilomorpha immaculatipes Pic, 1951
 Poecilomorpha impressipennis Pic, 1951
 Poecilomorpha lacordairii Westwood, 1864
 Poecilomorpha laosensis (Pic, 1922)
 Poecilomorpha laticornis Pic, 1951
 Poecilomorpha luteipennis Westwood, 1864
 Poecilomorpha maculata (Pic, 1926)
 Poecilomorpha maynei Pic, 1951
 Poecilomorpha mouhoti (Baly, 1864)
 Poecilomorpha nigroapicalis Pic, 1951
 Poecilomorpha nigrocyanea Motschulsky, 1866
 Poecilomorpha nigromaculata Pic, 1951
 Poecilomorpha overlaeti Pic, 1951
 Poecilomorpha passerini Hope, 1840
 Poecilomorpha preapicalis Pic, 1955
 Poecilomorpha pretiosa (Reineck, 1923)
 Poecilomorpha tarsata Bryant, 1941
 Poecilomorpha testaceipennis Pic, 1917
 Poecilomorpha trilineata Erber & Medvedev, 2002
 Poecilomorpha trimaculata Pic, 1951
 Poecilomorpha usambarica Weise, 1902
 Poecilomorpha variabilis Perroud, 1853
 Poecilomorpha viridipennis Pic, 1951
 Poecilomorpha westermanni Westwood, 1864

References

Megalopodidae genera
Taxa named by Frederick William Hope